The Casa Coe da Sol is a historic site in St. Petersburg, Florida. It is located at 510 Park Street. On July 17, 1980, it was added to the U.S. National Register of Historic Places.  It was the last commission of the famed 1920s architect Addison Mizner.

References

External links
 Pinellas County listings at National Register of Historic Places
 Pinellas County listings at Florida's Office of Cultural and Historical Programs

National Register of Historic Places in Pinellas County, Florida
Houses in St. Petersburg, Florida